Richard Angelo Rodríguez Rodríguez (born 21 November 1978) is a Chilean male track and road cyclist. He represented his native country at the 1999 Pan American Games in Winnipeg, Manitoba, Canada.

Career highlights

1998
1st in Stage 2 Vuelta Ciclista de Chile, Valdivia (CHI)
1999
9th in General Classification Vuelta Ciclista de Chile (CHI)
2000
3rd in Stage 1 Vuelta Ciclista de Chile, Los Andes (CHI)
2nd in Stage 4 Vuelta Ciclista de Chile, Los Maitenes (CHI)
2nd in Stage 6 Vuelta Ciclista de Chile, Penco (CHI)
2nd in Stage 7-a Vuelta Ciclista de Chile, Talca (CHI)
2nd in General Classification Vuelta Ciclista de Chile (CHI)
2001
stage Giro de Cosenza
2002
 in Pan American Championships, Track, Madison, Quito (ECU)
 in Pan American Championships, Track, Team Pursuit, Quito (ECU)
2003
1st in Stage 3 part a Vuelta Ciclista de Chile, Talca (CHI)
2nd in Stage 4 Vuelta Ciclista de Chile, Curepto (CHI)
3rd in Stage 6 Vuelta Ciclista de Chile, San Antonio (CHI)
2nd in Stage 8 Vuelta Ciclista de Chile, Limache (CHI)
1st in Stage 10 Vuelta Ciclista de Chile, Circuito Vitacura (CHI)
10th in General Classification Vuelta Ciclista de Chile (CHI)
3rd in Stage 1 Volta do Rio de Janeiro, Angra dos Reis (BRA)
1st in Stage 3 Volta do Rio de Janeiro, São Pedro da Aldeia (BRA)
1st in Stage 4 Volta do Rio de Janeiro, Niteroi (BRA)
1st in Stage 5 Volta do Rio de Janeiro, Rio de Janeiro (circuito) (BRA)
3rd in General Classification Volta do Rio de Janeiro (BRA)
2005
1st in Stage 1 Vuelta Ciclista Lider al Sur, Castro (CHI)
 in  National Championship, Road, Elite, Chile (CHI)
1st in Stage 2 Vuelta Ciclista de Chile, Rancagua (CHI)
2nd in Stage 5 Vuelta Ciclista de Chile, Villa Alemana (CHI)
7th in General Classification Vuelta Ciclista de Chile
1st in Stage 11 Vuelta a Venezuela, El Tigro (VEN)
2006
1st in Stage 3 Vuelta a Mendoza (ARG)
1st in Stage 1 part a Vuelta Ciclista Lider al Sur, Castro (CHI)
1st in Stage 3 part a Vuelta Ciclista Lider al Sur, Valdivia (CHI)
2nd in Stage 4 Vuelta Ciclista Lider al Sur, Pucon (CHI)
3rd in Stage 8 part a Vuelta Ciclista Lider al Sur, Curico (CHI)
 in  National Championship, Road, Elite, Chile (CHI)
1st in Stage 8 Vuelta al Estado Zulia (VEN)
2007
1st in Stage 5 Vuelta de Atacama, Copiapo (CHI)
6th in Championship world  B Capetwon Sudafrica

References
 

1978 births
Living people
Chilean male cyclists
Cyclists at the 1999 Pan American Games
Vuelta Ciclista de Chile stage winners
Place of birth missing (living people)
Pan American Games medalists in cycling
Pan American Games bronze medalists for Chile
Medalists at the 1999 Pan American Games
20th-century Chilean people
21st-century Chilean people